The defense of Palau is the responsibility of the United States, but local police matters are handled by the Palau Police, the national police force. Some of the sixteen states also had separate police departments during the 1980s and 1990s.

The Palau Bureau of Public Division of Marine Law Enforcement (DMLE) is responsible for marine  surveillance, maritime law enforcement, search and rescue in Palau's territorial waters and its 200 nm exclusive economic zone (EEZ).  The DMLE operated a Pacific-class patrol boat, the PSS President H.I. Remeliik which has now been replaced by the PSS Remeliik II. They also operate the PPS Kedam for use in maritime surveillance and fisheries control over Palau's EEZ. Its home port is Koror. The DMLE also operate three smaller 15-meter inshore patrol vessels, Euatel, Kabekl M'tal and Bul, used for surveillance of inshore and territorial waters.

The Remeliik was donated and is maintained by Australia, who also provide training for the crew. 
The other four vessels were donated by The Nippon Foundation and The Sasakawa Peace Foundation. In addition, DMLE have a search and rescue Rigid Hulled Inflatable Boat (RHIB) and a twin 85 hp boat. They are used only for inshore operations. The Bureau of Public Safety Director is Aloysius Alonz. Palau has provided police officers to the Regional Assistance Mission to Solomon Islands since May 2006. Palauan Police officer Bryson Ngiratumerang is contingent commander of the Palauan police serving as part of RAMSI's Participating Police Force (PPF).

The Palau Division of Maritime Law Enforcement has approximately 30 staff, 5 of which are paid for by The Nippon Foundation.

Equipment

Ships
 PSS Remeliik II
 PSS Kedam
PSS Euatel
PSS Kabekl M'tal 
PSS Bul

Former Ships 

 PSS Remeliik

References

External links
Republic of Palau - The Executive Branch
Republic of Palau - The Executive Branch
Palau | Regional Assistance Mission to Solomon Islands
Saipan Tribune
Martin J Cassidy – Pacific Police Patches

 
Politics of Palau
Law of Palau